The 89th Battalion (Alberta), CEF, was an infantry battalion of the Great War Canadian Expeditionary Force. The 89th Battalion was authorized on 22 December 1915 and embarked for Britain on 2 June 1916, where its personnel were absorbed by the 9th Reserve Battalion, CEF, to provide reinforcements for the Canadian Corps in the field. The battalion disbanded on 21 May 1917.

The battalion recruited throughout Alberta and was mobilized at Calgary.

Once placed on active service, the battalion was commanded by Lieutenant-Colonel W.W. Nasmyth from 2 June 1916 to 1 August 1916.

The battalion was awarded the battle honour .

The perpetuation of the 89th Battalion, CEF, was assigned in 1924 to the 2nd Battalion, the Calgary Regiment. This regiment, now the King's Own Calgary Regiment (RCAC), continues to perpetuate the 89th Battalion.

References

Sources
Canadian Expeditionary Force 1914–1919 by Col. G.W.L. Nicholson, CD, Queen's Printer, Ottawa, Ontario, 1962

Battalions of the Canadian Expeditionary Force
Military units and formations of Alberta
King's Own Calgary Regiment